The 2021 New York County District Attorney election was held on November 2, 2021, to elect the New York County District Attorney. The incumbent, Cyrus Vance Jr., had announced in March 2021 that he would not seek a fourth term.

The Democratic primary election was held on June 22, 2021. Despite the introduction of Ranked-choice voting for other elected positions in New York City, this race used plurality voting, as it is a statewide position, not city-wide.

Democratic primary

Candidates 

Tahanie Aboushi, civil rights attorney
Alvin Bragg, former New York State Chief Deputy Attorney General and former federal prosecutor
Liz Crotty, former Assistant District Attorney for Manhattan
Tali Farhadian Weinstein, former federal prosecutor
Diana Florence, former prosecutor for the Manhattan Attorney General's office
Lucy Lang, former assistant attorney general for Manhattan
Eliza Orlins, public defender, former contestant on Survivor and The Amazing Race
Dan Quart, New York State Assemblymember for the 73rd district (2011-present)

Endorsements

Polling

Results

Republican primary

Candidates 
Thomas Kenniff, former prosecutor

Results

General election

Results

Notes

References 

New York County District Attorneys
New York County District Attorney
New York County District Attorney election
New York County District Attorney 2021
New York County District Attorney election